Scott Kennedy may refer to:

 Scott Kennedy (comedian) (1965–2013), American stand-up comedian
 Scott Kennedy (soccer) (born 1997), Canadian soccer player
 Scott Hamilton Kennedy (born 1965), documentary director
Scott Kennedy, lead vocalist of Bleed from Within